Tappeh-ye Choghā Mīsh (Persian language; چغامیش čoġā mīš) dating back to 6800 BC, is the site of a Chalcolithic settlement in Western Iran, located in the Khuzistan Province on the Susiana Plain. It was occupied at the beginning of 6800 BC and continuously from the Neolithic up to the Proto-Literate period (Uruk period), thus spanning the time periods from Archaic through Elamite. Later, the nearby Susa became culturally dominant in this area.

Settlement began after the caprids and cattle were domesticated, and it probably spanned the later time in which pigs and horses were domesticated. There was also a period of Achaemenid occupation.

Excavations
Chogha Mish is located on the Susiana Plain, just to the east of Dez River, and about 25km to the east from the ancient Susa.

Excavations were conducted at the site between 1961 and 1978, for a total of 11 seasons by the Oriental Institute, under the direction of Pinhas Delougaz and Helene Kantor.

The excavation's dig house at Qaleh Khalil was destroyed during the Iranian Revolution so many finds and records were either lost or destroyed.

Early developments

The site was occupied continuously, and played a central role in the cultural and social development of the region from approximately 6900 BCE (Archaic Susiana) to 5000 BCE (the Middle Susiana period).

Nearby, Chogha Bonut is an even earlier site.

In the early part of the fifth millennium BCE, the Chogha Mish main monumental building was destroyed. This became known as the 'Burnt Building'.

This destruction of Chogha Mish also coincided with the abandonment of some other sites on the eastern part of the Susiana plain. This took place in the middle of the fifth millennium BCE. The new pottery associated with this period was of the Late Susiana 1 type, featuring the 'dot motif'.

The settlements of the subsequent period shifted more to the west. This is associated with the activities of the highland mobile pastoralists in the eastern part of the area.

Around 3400 BCE, during the Late Uruk phase, more occupants returned to the area.

Correlations with prehistoric Mesopotamia
Chogha Mish provides important evidence for early connections between Susiana and Mesopotamia. The discoveries at Chogha Mish show that the Early Susiana period was contemporary with the Ubaid 1 period of southern Mesopotamia and the Samarra period of central Mesopotamia.

The Close-Line ware of Archaic Susiana 3 phase was contemporary with the Ubaid O phase, which antedates the previously known Ubaid sequence of southern Mesopotamia. The painted pottery of the Samarra period in central Mesopotamia came later.

According to archaeologists,

"Prior to the fifth millennium B.C., Chogha Mish, with about 17 ha of occupation area, was the largest population center. Oriental Institute archaeological investigations at the site from 1969 to 1979 also showed increasing social and economic complexity until it was temporarily abandoned sometime in the early fifth millennium B.C., perhaps ca. 4800 BC."

Nevertheless, a transitional settlement continued on a smaller scale. Around 4400 B.C., the nearby Susa was probably established, and became the largest settlement dominating the area.

Protoliterate period
The Protoliterate (Uruk) period in the area started around 3400 BCE. At this time, Chogha Mish was again the main site on the eastern Susiana plain. It now became part of a cultural area connected with southern Mesopotamia and the related colonies to the west.

Kiln technology
Chogha Mish provides examples of some earliest kilns in the Middle East. These kilns date to the Middle Susiana 1 period, and on to the Protoliterate period. A pottery kiln at Chogha Mish now provides the earliest known prototype for the Early Dynastic Period (Mesopotamia) kilns. This double-chamber kiln is about 2.20 m. in diameter. It shows close parallels to the Early Dynastic II and III examples at Abu Salabikh and the Diyala River region.

Development of writing
The city is important today for information about the development of writing. At Chogha Mish and Susa, evidence begins with an accounting system using clay tokens, over time changing to clay tablets with marks, finally to the cuneiform writing system.

Gallery

See also

Tall-i Bakun
Chogha Bonut
Prehistory of Iran
Cities of the ancient Near East

Notes

References 
Helene J. Kantor, The Elamite Cup from Chogha Mish, Iran, vol. 15, pp. 11–14, 1977 
Abbas Alizadeh, A Protoliterate Pottery Kiln from Chogha Mish, Iran, vol. 23, pp. 39–50, 1985
Levent Atici, Sarah W. Kansa, Justin SE. Lev-Tov. "Chogha Mish Fauna". (2010) Levent Atici, Sarah W. Kansa, Justin SE. Lev-Tov (Eds.). Released: 2010-08-24. Open Context. DOI: https://doi.org/10.6078/M7M906K5 ARK (Archive): https://n2t.net/ark:/28722/k26m3c58g
Lev-Tov, Justin, Sarah W. Kansa, Levent Atici, and Jane C. Wheeler 2017, New Light on Faunal Remain from Chogha Mish, Iran. In J. Lev-Tov, P. Hesse, and A. Gilbert (eds.), The Wide Lense in Archaeology: Honoring Brian Hesse's Contributions to Anthropological Archaeology. Atlanta, GA: Lockwood Press. Pp. 443–475.
Atici, Levent, Sarah Kansa, Justin Lev-Tov, and Eric Kansa 2013, Other People's Data: A Demonstration of the Imperative of Publishing Primary Data. Journal of Archaeological Method and Theory1(3): 1-19.
Alizadeh, Abbas 2008, Chogha Mish II: The Development of a Prehistoric Regional Center in Lowland Susiana, Southwestern Iran. The University of Chicago, Oriental Institute. Oriental Institute Publication Vol. 130. Chicago.

External links
 Chogha Mish iranicaonline.org
Zooarchaeological observations from Prehistoric and Achaemenid levels at Chogha Mish, Iran. Project Chogha Mish Fauna

Populated places established in the 7th millennium BC
Archaeological sites in Iran
Former populated places in Khuzestan Province
Clay tablets
Elam
Ubaid period
Prehistoric Iran
Uruk period